Hinkle Creek is a stream in Indiana which empties into Morse Reservoir. Via Cicero Creek, the outlet of Morse Reservoir, it is part of the White River watershed, and thence the Wabash, Ohio, and Mississippi rivers.

Quaker settlers established Hinkle Creek Church in 1836 near the stream. Other settlers also established communities in the area.  In 1865 in Deming, Indiana, a mill, known as Cook Mill, for grinding corn was created on the creek.

References

Rivers of Indiana